Columbus Municipal Airport may refer to:

Columbus Municipal Airport (Indiana) in Columbus, Indiana, United States (FAA: BAK, IATA: CLU)
Columbus Municipal Airport (New Mexico) in Columbus, New Mexico, United States (FAA: 0NM0, IATA: CUS)
Columbus Municipal Airport (Nebraska) in Columbus, Nebraska, United States (FAA/IATA: OLU)
Columbus Municipal Airport (North Dakota) in Columbus, North Dakota, United States (FAA: D49)
Columbus County Municipal Airport in Columbus County, North Carolina, United States (FAA: CPC)

See also
Columbus Airport (disambiguation)